Life of the Virgin are narrative scenes of the life of Mary in art, literature or music. Works with this title include:
 Life of the Virgin (Carpaccio), a 1504–1508 cycle of paintings
 Life of the Virgin (Lotto), a 1525 cycle of frescoes
 Life of the Virgin (Maximus), a possibly 7th century biography